The Battle of Delhi or Battle of Patparganj took place on 11 September 1803 during the Second Anglo-Maratha War, between British East India Company troops of the Bombay Army under General Lake, and Marathas of Scindia's army under General Louis Bourquin and Sardar Ravsaheb Wable.

Events
"Bourquin had treacherously deserted his former friend General Perron and now commanded 1743 battalions of the latter's troops"
The battle was fought at Mosadabad, right across the Yamuna River from Humayun's Tomb, also giving the battle its local name.

The Marathas initially occupied a strong position with the Yamuna River in their rear. But, General Gerard Lake, feigning a retreat, drew them from their lines and then turning upon them drove them with the bayonet into the river, inflicting more losses upon them. Finally, the city of Delhi fell three days later. As a result, the control of the city of Delhi passed from the Marathas to the British.

A monument was later erected at the site in Patparganj, marked out by a surrounding ditch, commemorating Cornet Sanguine and the Company army soldiers who fell during the battle.

References

Sources
Fanshawe, Herbert Charles. Delhi past and present p. 68
Marshman, John Clark. The History of India, from the earliest period to the close Lord Dalhousie's administration, Volume 2

Conflicts in 1803
Battles involving the Maratha Empire
Battles of the Second Anglo-Maratha War
1803 in India
Battle
Battles involving the British East India Company
Military history of Delhi
September 1803 events